Soy Andina is a 2007 American documentary film directed by Mitchell Teplitsky. It tells the story of two New York dancers and their exploration of mixed Peruvian and American identities.

Plot
Cynthia Paniagua, a modern dancer from Queens with Andean heritage, begins taking lessons with Nelida Silva, an immigrant folk dancer also from the Andes. She travels to Peru to learn more. In 2000, Nelida returns to her native village to host The Patron Saint Festival, and there the two reconnect.

Release
The film was shot over a period of five years and premiered at the Film Society of Lincoln Center in September 2007. The film also screened at the 2007 Los Angeles Latino Film Festival, and the U.S. Embassy organized two screening tours of the film in Peru.

References

External links
 
 

American documentary films
Films shot in New York City
2007 films
Documentary films about dance
2000s English-language films
2000s American films